Nottidge Charles MacNamara  (1833–1918) was a Surgeon-General in the Indian Medical Service and later a consulting ophthalmic surgeon in London.

Career
Nottidge MacNamara was born in Uxbridge, Middlesex to Daniel MacNamara MRCS RN (1791-1851) and Frances née Fennell (1802-1875). He studied at King's College Hospital and, on 4 Nov 1854, after qualifying MRCS, joined the Bengal Army as an Assistant Surgeon; becoming Surgeon on 4 Nov 1866, Surgeon Major on 1 Jul 1873, he became FCRS, England in 1875 and retired from the army on 15 Apr 1876. He served in the Sonthal campaign of 1855-56, and held the chair of Ophthalmic Surgery in Calcutta from December, 1863, till his retirement.

After his retirement he was Surgeon and Lecturer on Clinical Surgery at the Westminster Hospital, and Consulting Surgeon at the Westminster Ophthalmic Hospital, becoming FCRSI in 1887. He was a member of the Council of the Royal College of Surgeons, England, from 1885 to 1901, Vice President in 1893 and 1896. He also served as Vice-President of the British Medical Association; a member of the War Office Committee of the Army Medical Service, and the Government Committee on Leprosy; and as Chairman of the Committee of British Medical Associations on Medical education and of Teaching University for London.

Family
His father Daniel MacNamara was a RN Surgeon married Frances Fennel Aug 13 1823 in Marylebone Parish. The MacNamara pedigree is registered with the College of Arms in Dublin and London. Nottidge Charles MacNamara was the 6th son in a family of thirteen Children. His brother Francis Nottidge M.D became a Surgeon General and was Professor of Chemistry at the Medical College, Calcutta.

Family Crest
A naked arm holding in the hand a Scimitar all Ppr(proper).

Works

See also
 
Memorials of The Danvers Family

References

External links

English surgeons
1833 births
1918 deaths
People from Uxbridge
Alumni of King's College London
British East India Company Army officers